Paoluccio Cattamara (active 1718) was an artist of Naples, who painted fruit, birds, and medals, in still life canvases.

Sources

18th-century Italian painters
Italian male painters
Painters from Naples
Italian still life painters
Italian Baroque painters
18th-century Italian male artists